Tyrlyninskaya is a rural locality (a village) in Verkhovskoye Rural Settlement, Tarnogsky District, Vologda Oblast, Russia. The population was 24 as of 2002.

Geography 
Tyrlyninskaya is located 45 km southwest of Tarnogsky Gorodok (the district's administrative centre) by road. Doroninskaya is the nearest rural locality.

References 

Rural localities in Tarnogsky District